John William Bricker (September 6, 1893March 22, 1986) was an American politician and attorney who served as a United States senator and the 54th governor of Ohio. He was also the Republican nominee for Vice President in 1944.

Born in Madison County, Ohio, Bricker attended Ohio State University and began a legal practice in Columbus, Ohio. He also served in the United States Army during World War I. He held various public offices between 1920 and 1937, including the position of Ohio Attorney General. Bricker served three terms as Governor of Ohio from 1939 to 1945. Bricker was an unsuccessful candidate for the Republican presidential nomination in 1944. He was Thomas E. Dewey's running mate on the Republican ticket in the 1944 election, campaigning against the New Deal and President Franklin D. Roosevelt's judicial nominees. The Republican ticket was defeated by the Democratic ticket of Roosevelt and Harry S. Truman.

Bricker won election to the Senate in 1946. He introduced the Bricker Amendment, which would have limited the president's power to make treaties. Though the Bricker Amendment received support from some members of both parties, it was not passed by Congress. Bricker won re-election in 1952 but was narrowly defeated by Stephen M. Young in 1958. After leaving office, Bricker resumed the practice of law and died in 1986.

Early life and education
Bricker was born on a farm near Mount Sterling in Madison County in south central Ohio. He was the son of Laura (née King) and Lemuel Spencer Bricker. He attended Ohio State University at Columbus, where he divided his time between the debating team, the varsity baseball team, and the Delta Chi Fraternity. After graduating with a Bachelor of Arts from Ohio State in 1916 and from its law school in 1920, he was admitted to the bar in 1917 and began his legal practice in Columbus in 1920.

Public service
During World War I, Bricker served as first lieutenant and chaplain in the United States Army in 1917 and 1918.  He was subsequently the solicitor for Grandview Heights, Ohio, from 1920 to 1928, assistant Attorney General of Ohio from 1923 to 1927, a member of the Public Utilities Commission of Ohio from 1929 to 1932, and Attorney General of Ohio from 1933 to 1937.

He was elected governor for three two-year terms, serving from 1939 to 1945, each time winning with a greater margin of victory.  Bricker espoused a stance against centralized government, preferring to increase involvement in state and local governments, and made this known in his inaugural address as Governor:

Bricker was the 1944 Republican nominee for vice president, running with presidential nominee Thomas E. Dewey, the governor of New York who was nine years Bricker's junior.  The Republicans lost handily to the Democratic ticket of Franklin D. Roosevelt and Harry S. Truman.  In that campaign, Bricker proved to be a tireless campaigner, visiting thirty-one states and making 173 speeches, including 28 over a six-day period.  His final remarks came on radio on election eve from the governor's office in Columbus, when he declared: "Not only has the New Deal depleted our resources, recklessly spent our money, but it has undermined the very spiritual foundations of our government."  Though most of his campaigning was in New England, the Midwest, and the West, Bricker even visited the then-historically and -heavily Democratic state of Texas, where in Dallas, he called Franklin Roosevelt "a front for the Hillman-Browder Communist Party," referring to the respective leaders of the Congress of Industrial Organizations and the Communist Party of the United States of America.

In 1946, Bricker was elected to the United States Senate.  He was re-elected in 1952, serving from January 3, 1947, to January 3, 1959.

Governor Dewey was the Republican presidential nominee again in 1948, but Senator Bricker was not his running mate.  Dewey chose instead Governor Earl Warren of California in the hope that the 1948 ticket would carry California, which the Dewey-Bricker ticket had failed to do.  The Dewey-Warren ticket also lost California, and the absence of Bricker on the second ticket may have been a factor in Dewey's failure to win Bricker's home state of Ohio again.  Bricker campaigned with Warren in 1944 in Sacramento, where Bricker attacked the politics of war-time rationing; then in San Francisco Bricker charged that Roosevelt had packed the U.S. judiciary with liberal jurists hostile to the Constitution.  However, even if Dewey had carried both California and Ohio in 1948, the two large states would have been insufficient to elect him President in that second campaign.

Bricker's Senate service is best remembered for his attempts to amend the United States Constitution to limit the President's treaty-making powers (the Bricker Amendment).  He was the chairman of the Committee on Interstate and Foreign Commerce during the 83rd Congress.

On July 12, 1947, a former Capitol police officer, William Louis Kaiser, fired shots at Senator Bricker as he boarded the underground subway from the Senate office building to the Capitol.  The two shots, fired at close range, narrowly missed their target.  Kaiser stated he was "trying to refresh" Bricker's memory.  Kaiser had served on the police force as a protege of Bricker's predecessor in the Senate and had complained of losing substantial money on Columbus real estate.  An investigation concluded that Kaiser may have fired blanks or else purposely missed Bricker.

Bricker voted in favor of the Civil Rights Act of 1957.  In 1958, Stephen M. Young ran for the Senate against the incumbent Bricker.  Bricker seemed invincible, but Young capitalized on widespread public opposition to the proposed "right to work" amendment to Ohio's constitution, which Bricker had endorsed.  Few thought that Young, 70 at the time, could win; even members of his own party had doubts, particularly Ohio's other senator, Democrat Frank J. Lausche.  In an upset amid a national Democratic trend, Young defeated Bricker by 52 to 48 percent.  Bricker then retired from public life.

Professional life and death
In 1945, Bricker founded the Columbus law firm now known as Bricker & Eckler. The firm now has additional offices in Cleveland, Cincinnati, Dayton, Marietta, Barnesville, and Lebanon. It is now one of the ten largest firms in the state of Ohio. The firm has maintained an office and conference room in Bricker's honor in its Columbus office featuring memorabilia from Bricker's political career.

He was married to the former Harriet Day.

After leaving the Senate, John Bricker resumed the practice of law. He died in Columbus on March 22, 1986, at the age of 92 and is interred at Green Lawn Cemetery.

Miscellaneous
 Bricker Hall on the Ohio State University campus is named for him. The building currently serves as the home of many of the university administrative units, including the Office of the Board of Trustees and President Dr. Michael V. Drake. Bricker was a member of the OSU Board of Trustees from 1948 to 1969.
 The Bricker Building at the Ohio Expo Center (site of the annual Ohio State Fair and many other events) is named for him.
 The John W. Bricker Federal Building in downtown Columbus is named for him.
 In Philip K. Dick's 1962 novel The Man in the High Castle, set in an alternate timeline, Bricker succeeded John Nance Garner as the 33rd President of the United States in 1940.
 Bricker intervened in the 1956 deportation of Dr. Peter Tchen, father of Tina Tchen,  former Time's Up CEO and Chief of Staff to Michelle Obama, by introducing a bill to grant him permanent residency.

References

External links

 Former Capitol Policeman Shoots at Senator - Ghosts of DC blog
John Bricker Oral History finding aid, Dwight D. Eisenhower Presidential Library

Grave

1893 births
1986 deaths
20th-century American politicians
Burials at Green Lawn Cemetery (Columbus, Ohio)
Republican Party governors of Ohio
Lawyers from Columbus, Ohio
Military personnel from Ohio
Ohio State University Moritz College of Law alumni
Ohio Attorneys General
Ohio State Buckeyes baseball players
Ohio State University trustees
Old Right (United States)
People from Grandview Heights, Ohio
People from Madison County, Ohio
Politicians from Columbus, Ohio
Republican Party (United States) vice presidential nominees
Republican Party United States senators from Ohio
United States Army chaplains
United States Army officers
Candidates in the 1944 United States presidential election
1944 United States vice-presidential candidates
World War I chaplains
20th-century American lawyers
American anti-communists
20th-century American clergy
United States Army personnel of World War I